The South American Youth Championship 1967 was held in Asunción, Paraguay.

Teams
The following teams entered the tournament:

 
 
 
 
 
  (host)

Group stage

Group A

Tie-breaker

Note:Argentina qualified after the result was decided by tossing a coin

Group B

Semifinals

Final

Note: Argentina won the championship after the result was decided by tossing a coin.

Squads

Argentina 
José Alberto Pérez (River Plate), Jorge D'Alessandro (San Lorenzo), Jorge Eduardo Dominici (River Plate), José Gómez (Gimnasia y Esgrima LP), Horacio Tocalini (Chacarita Juniors), Carlos Siciliano (Racing Club), Eduardo Commisso (River Plate), Jorge Teijón (Deportivo Morón), Marcos Ricciardi (Chacarita Juniors), José Martínez (San Lorenzo), Francisco Cibeyra (River Plate), Héctor Martínez (Racing Club), José Pasternak (Gimnasia y Esgrima LP), Antonio García (San Lorenzo), Enrique Wolff (Racing Club), Juan Loyola (Chacarita Juniors), Miguel Converti (Banfield), Carlos García Cambón (Chacarita Juniors)
Managers: Juan Carlos Giménez and Mario Imbelloni.

References

South American Youth Championship
1967 in youth association football
Sports competitions in Asunción
March 1967 sports events in South America
1960s in Asunción